Allocotocerus yalumbaboothbyi is a species of water beetle in the family Hydrophilidae, first described by Chris H.S. Watts in 1998.

Both larvae and adults are aquatic. The species is found in bodies of standing water, in the coastal zones of Western Australia and the Northern Territory.

References

Hydrophilinae
Taxa described in 1998